Chinese National Olympic Committee may refer to:

 Chinese Olympic Committee (PRC)
 Chinese Taipei Olympic Committee (ROC)